Buddy Handleson (born November 1, 1999) is an American actor, best known for playing Henry Dillon in Disney Teen sitcom Shake It Up, Wendell Bassett in Nickelodeon comedy series Wendell & Vinnie, and Newt on Bella and the Bulldogs, also on Nickelodeon. On June 25, 2017, he came out as gay. He first announced it in an Instagram post.

Biography 

Buddy is the son of Jay and Athena Handleson. At the age of 3, his parents tried to introduce him to modeling, but the young Buddy Handleson did not like it. He was spotted by the talent agent Cathy Steele based in Orlando.

He started auditioning for acting roles at the age of 7 and taking acting lessons with Romeo Marquez. In 2010, he co-starred in an episode of 'Til Death, and guest-starred in an episode of Sons of Tucson (role of Gabe AKA "Asskiss" in episode Kisses and Beads). In February 2013, he landed the lead role of Wendell Bassett in Wendell and Vinnie.

Filmography

Personal life

Handleson lived in Burbank with his mom from 2012-2014 and then moved to Redondo Beach, California. 

On June 25, 2017, Handleson came out as gay through a caption on an Instagram photo depicting him in front of a pride flag. He wrote,
"Over the past couple of years I've become more and more comfortable with my sexuality and I think I'm ready to share it with the world. I'm finally at a place in life where I can say 'I'm proud of who I am. I'm proud to be gay.'"

References

External links

1999 births
Living people
Male actors from California
American male child actors
American male television actors
American gay actors
LGBT people from California
People from Danville, California
21st-century LGBT people